Laura Ann Wilkinson (born November 17, 1977 in Houston, Texas) is an American diver, 3 time Olympian, and Olympic gold medalist. She is the first woman to win the three major diving world titles. Wilkinson retired in 2008. After nine years of retirement, she returned to competition in 2017 and placed 2nd at Nationals. She trained for her fourth Olympic Games (2021) at Texas A&M University’s swimming and diving facilities but did not qualify.

Background 
Wilkinson was born and raised in Houston, Texas and lived with her parents, Ed and Linda Wilkinson. She attended Klein High School in Houston before going to University of Texas. As a child, Wilkinson was a gymnast, but had to give up on the sport after a growth spurt during puberty made her too tall to continue. It was then that she turned to diving. When she first started diving, a teacher told her she was too old to start a new sport and was later kicked off her high school team because they thought she was a "waste of space". Wilkinson is a 2001 graduate of the University of Texas, where she majored in public relations. While attending school on a scholarship, she decided that she would rather put school on hold and go after her dream to become an Olympian. She trained in The Woodlands, Texas.

Career
Wilkinson's interest in the sport began as she was swimming in the gym's pool and watched a  young female diver in training execute an impressive dive. Her first jump off the 10 meter platform didn't occur until she was 15 years old. She took up platform diving and joined the U.S. National Team in 1995.

2000 Summer Olympics
Six months prior to the 2000 Summer Olympics, Wilkinson suffered a serious foot injury that kept her out of action for a couple of months.  She employed a visualization technique to practice  her dives during this time, and wasn't fully healed when she qualified for the 2000 Summer Olympics.  Still in pain from her foot injury, she landed in eighth place after the first of five dives in the platform finals.  She went on to earn the first gold medal for a female American platform diver since 1964.

2004 Summer Olympics
Wilkinson finished in fifth place at the 2004 Summer Olympics, but had left an impact on her competitors.  Several of them repeated the techniques she used at the 2000 Olympics by starting their dives with a handstand.

2008 Summer Olympics
On June 26, 2008, Wilkinson qualified as a member of the 2008 U.S. Olympic Diving Team in diving by taking first place in the trials.  She announced her retirement and this Olympics would be her final competition.

2020 Olympic Games
In 2017, after nine years of retirement, Wilkinson returned to competition and placed 2nd at U.S. Nationals. She trained full-time for the 2020 Tokyo Olympics—which would have been her fourth Olympic Games (delayed until 2021 due to the COVID-19 global pandemic), but did not qualify for the team.

Personal life 
Wilkinson is married to Eriek Hulseman. They welcomed their first child, a girl, Arella Joy, on May 11, 2011. In December 2012, they adopted a baby from China named Zoe. Wilkinson gave birth to a son, Zadok, in January 2014. Their fourth child, Dakaia, joined the family from Ethiopia in March 2018. She also travels around the country speaking to girls at The Revolve Tour, a Christian girls' conference. She had major surgery on her neck in 2018 to repair damage to discs injured by her diving career.

References

External links
 
 
 
 
 

American female divers
Divers at the 2000 Summer Olympics
Divers at the 2004 Summer Olympics
Divers at the 2008 Summer Olympics
Olympic gold medalists for the United States in diving
Sportspeople from Houston
Texas Longhorns women's swimmers
1977 births
Living people
Medalists at the 2000 Summer Olympics
World Aquatics Championships medalists in diving
Divers at the 2003 Pan American Games
Klein High School alumni
Pan American Games competitors for the United States